William Lewis Moody Jr. (January 25, 1865 – July 21, 1954) was an American financier and entrepreneur from Galveston, Texas, who founded a private bank, an insurance company, and one of the largest charitable foundations in the United States.  Moody was active in the day-to-day operations of his companies until two days before his death.

Personal life
Moody's parents were Col. William Lewis Moody and Pherabe Elizabeth Moody, née Bradley. Moody was born on January 25, 1865, in Fairfield, Texas. After attending boarding schools in Virginia, he attended Virginia Military Institute in Lexington, Virginia. Following that, he studied law at the University of Texas before going to work at his father's cotton business in Galveston in 1886.

On August 26, 1890, Moody married Libbie Rice Shearn. They had four children:Mary Elizabeth (who married Edwin Clyde Northen), William Lewis III, Shearn, and Libbie (who married Clark W. Thompson). Their family home, "The Moody Mansion", is now a museum.  Mary later took over many of the family businesses after Moody's death.

Business interests

In 1889, Moody set up the private bank W. L. Moody and Company,. In 1905, he founded American National Insurance Company,  which, at the time of Moody's death, was the biggest one west of the Mississippi River.

In 1907, Moody founded City National Bank. He served as President of the bank until he died. In 1953, the bank's name was changed to Moody National Bank in his honor.

Moody's business interests also included ventures outside of the financial arena.  In 1923 Moody purchased the Galveston Daily News, the oldest newspaper in Texas, from Alfred H. Belo.  He later expanded his media interests by acquiring the Galveston Tribune.

In 1930, Moody founded the National Hotel Company. His holdings at one time included the Galvez Hotel in Galveston and the Menger Hotel in San Antonio, Texas. In 1931, the company took control of a financially troubled Conrad Hilton's hotels, hiring Hilton to help manage the company. The merger later ended with Hilton taking back some of the hotels he had brought to the group.

Legacy

In 1942, Moody and his wife set up the Moody Foundation, to which Moody's estate was transferred after his death. The Foundation awards grants to various civic and environmental causes in Texas. The Moodys' daughter Mary helped run the foundation from its inception until her death in 1986, and members of the family are still involved.  Today the Moody Foundation has grown into a $1.197 billion USD charitable foundation, making grants throughout the state of Texas.

The Moody Coliseum in University Park, Texas, as well as Moody Towers on the University of Houston campus, are named after Moody. Texas A&M University Press publishes a series of books called the "W. L. Moody Jr. Natural History Series". At Rice University, one of the endowed chairs is for the W. L. Moody Jr. Professor of Mathematics, currently held by Robert Hardt; past holders include Morton L. Curtis.

Completed in 2011 the home of "Austin City Limits Live at The Moody Theater," was named after Moody in downtown Austin, Texas.

On October 21, 2013, it was announced that the foundation gave a $50 million gift to the University of Texas at Austin to name the college of communication the Moody College of Communication

Additionally, on November 12, 2019, the foundation announced a $100 million donation to Southern Methodist University to establish the Moody School of Graduate and Advanced Studies.

Also, in downtown Austin, Texas the Moody Center was completed in April 2022 and was dedicated by Matthew McConaughey. It stands as one of the largest private donations by the Moody Foundation to date.

Gallery

See also
Moody Foundation
Moody Gardens
Shearn Moody, Jr.

Notes

External links
Moody National Bank
The Moody Foundation
1859 Historic Hotels successor to the National Hotel Company.
Moody Mansion Historic Home
William Lewis Moody Jr. at Handbook of Texas Online
Mary Elizabeth Moody Northen at Handbook of Texas Online

1865 births
1954 deaths
American financiers
American bankers
American philanthropists
People from Galveston, Texas
Virginia Military Institute alumni
Businesspeople from Texas
19th-century American businesspeople
20th-century American businesspeople
People from Fairfield, Texas